Eric Laurent (1894–1958) was a Swedish stage and film actor.

Selected filmography
The Poetry of Ådalen (1928)
 The Realm of the Rye (1929)
 Lucky Devils (1932)
 Oh, What a Boy! (1939)
 The Train Leaves at Nine (1941)
 Doctor Glas (1942)
 Imprisoned Women (1943)
 The Forest Is Our Heritage (1944)
 Life in the Finnish Woods (1947)
 The Poetry of Ådalen (1947)
 Lars Hård (1948)
 Big Lasse of Delsbo (1949)
 Son of the Sea (1949)
 The Realm of the Rye (1950)
 Stronger Than the Law (1951)
 U-Boat 39 (1952)
 Ursula, the Girl from the Finnish Forests (1953)

References

Bibliography
 Goble, Alan. The Complete Index to Literary Sources in Film. Walter de Gruyter, 1999.

External links

1894 births
1958 deaths
Swedish male film actors
Swedish male silent film actors
Swedish male stage actors